Ruth Margery Addoms (1896–1951), was an American botanist at Duke University specializing in the study of plant anatomy and plant physiology. She contributed to the study of growth-promoting substances in plants.

Early life and education 
Addoms was born in Haworth, New Jersey to Lucy M.C. Addoms and William Henry Addoms, who was an exporter in Brooklyn, New York.

Addoms attended Packer Collegiate Institute, in Brooklyn. She received her A.B. degree from Wellesley College in 1918. In 1921, she received her master's degree in Botany from Wellesley. In 1926, Addoms earned her Doctorate from the University of Wisconsin.

Scientific career 
After earning her PhD, Addoms taught at Wellesley College and the University of Wisconsin. In 1930, she became a professor at Duke University, playing a crucial role in the development of Duke's Department of Botany and the Women's College. She was an active teacher and researcher for twenty years until her death in 1951. During her two decades at Duke, Addoms, with the help of her colleague Lewis Edward Anderson, built the institution's first general botany course.

Addoms was one of the eight original members of Duke's Botany department, which split from the Biology Department in 1935. In that time, she trained one PhD and helped chair Doctor Hugo L. Blomquist build and promote the fledgling department.

She contributed to several fields of plant anatomy and physiology. Most notably, Addoms was interested in promoting plant growth promotion. She also contributed to several textbooks on growth-promoting chemicals, as well as a general textbook on botany.

Honors and legacy 
Addoms was active both in civil and academic life. During World War II, she was the chairman of the Durham, North Carolina chapter of the British War Relief Society and a member of the city's Civil Defense organization during World War II. She also served as an active member of the local Girl Scout Council since its formation.

Professionally, she was a member and leader of many professional organization, such as Phi Beta Kappa, Sigma Xi, Sigma Delta Epsilon, the Botanical Society of America, and was a charter member of the American Society of Plant Physiologists.

In 1956, the Duke Women's College would be building a new dormitory partly in her name, the Gilbert-Addoms Residence Hall commemorating her service the college, to the Duke department of Botany, and her contributions to the field.

Selected publications

See also 
 American Society of Plant Physiologists
 Botany
 Duke University
 Women in science

References 

1896 births
1951 deaths
American women botanists
American botanists
People from Haworth, New Jersey
Duke University faculty
Wellesley College alumni
University of Wisconsin–Madison alumni
20th-century American women
American women academics